Huolongchushui (fire dragon issuing from the water) were the earliest form of multistage rockets and ballistic missiles used in post-classical China. The name of the weapon was used to strike fear into enemy troops. If the enemy was out of range, the fire dragon had a contingency: a magazine of three rocket driven arrows located within the mouth of the missile. It acted as one of the world's earliest multistage rockets and ballistic missiles, and was fired at enemy ships in naval battles.

Overview

The Huolongchushui had a hollow bamboo tube with a carved wooden dragon head and tail about five feet long. The front and rear contained four rockets packed with gunpowder that propelled the dragon forwards. Fuses facing downwards out of the four rockets outside the dragon body were linked with the fuses of the rockets inside the dragon's belly. Just before the four rockets on the outside burnt out, it would automatically ignite fuses of arrow rockets hidden inside the rear of the dragon, which would then shoot out of its mouth propelled by the gunpowder to destroy the enemy. The Huolongchushui would be used on both land and sea. The Huolongchushui would operate on the principle of an early form of a two-stage rocket. The two stage rocket would have a booster rocket attached to it that would then burn out automatically issuing a batch of smaller rockets hidden inside the dragon's belly.

History
An illustration of the Huolongchushui is found in the 14th century Chinese military treatise Huolongjing by Jiao Yu and Liu Bowen during the early Ming dynasty. The illustration and description depicts the world earliest form of the multistage rocket and ballistic missile used by Ming Chinese army and navy.

Popular culture
Huolongchushui were the primary inspiration for the man-portable artillery depicted in Disney's Mulan.

Huolongchushui are discussed in Liu Cixin's 2010 science-fiction novel Death's End (on page 98 of 766 of the 2016 English translation by Ken Liu), as a comparison to a fictional multistage nuclear-propelled space probe.

Notes

References
 Needham, Joseph (1986). Science and Civilization in China: Volume 5, Chemistry and Chemical Technology, Part 7, Military Technology; the Gunpowder Epic. Taipei: Caves Books Ltd.

Ballistic missiles
Chinese inventions
Medieval artillery
Military history of the Ming dynasty
Multiple rocket launchers
Artillery of China
Naval weapons of China